The August 2010 Baghlia bombing occurred on August 18, 2010 when a bomb detonated against a convoy of the Algerian People's National Armed Forces in the town of Baghlia, Boumerdès Province, Algeria killing 3 and injuring 5. The Al-Qaeda Organization in the Islamic Maghreb is suspected as being responsible.

See also
 Terrorist bombings in Algeria
 List of terrorist incidents, 2010

References

Boumerdès Province
Suicide car and truck bombings in Algeria
Mass murder in 2010
Terrorist incidents in Algeria
Terrorist incidents in Algeria in 2010
Islamic terrorism in Algeria
2010 murders in Algeria